Elected judicial positions in Washington State are nonpartisan; in 1912, Washington voters amended the constitution, adopting nonpartisan elections as the way to select judges.

Court of Appeals

Court of Appeals, Division I, District King 
Judge Position 5 - Linda Lau (NP)

Court of Appeals, Division I, District King 
Judge Position 6 - Ann Schindler (NP)

Court of Appeals, Division I, District Snohomish* 
Judge Position 2 - J. Robert Leach (NP)

Court of Appeals, Division II, Pierce 
Judge Position 2 - Elaine Houghton (NP)

Court of Appeals, Division II, Clallam, Grays Harbor, Jefferson, Kitsap, Mason, Thurston
Judge Position 1 - Joyce (Robin) Hunt (NP)

Court of Appeals, Division III, Ferry, Lincoln, Okanogan, Pend Orelle, Spokane, Stevens
Judge Position 2 - Kevin Korsmo (NP)

Court of Appeals, Division III, Chelan, Douglas, Kittitas, Klickitat, Yakima
Judge Position 1 - Stephen M. Brown (NP)

Superior Court

Asotin, Columbia, Garfield Superior 
Judge Position 1 - William D. (Bill) Acey (NP)

Judge Position 1
Benton, Franklin Superior Court 
Bruce A. Spanner (NP)

Judge Position 2
Benton, Franklin Superior Court 
Robert (Bob) Swisher (NP)

Judge Position 3
Benton, Franklin Superior Court 
Craig J. Matheson (NP)

Judge Position 4
Benton, Franklin Superior Court 
Cameron Mitchell (NP)

Judge Position 5
Benton, Franklin Superior Court 
Vic L. VanderSchoor (NP)

Judge Position 6
Benton, Franklin Superior Court 
Carrie Runge (NP)

Judge Position 1
Ferry, Pend Oreille, Stevens 
Rebecca M. Baker (NP)

Judge Position 2
Ferry, Pend Oreille, Stevens 
Allen C. Nielson (NP)

Judge Position 1
Klickitat, Skamania Superior Court 
E. Thompson Reynolds (NP)

Judge Position 1
Pacific, Wahkiakum Superior Court 
Michael J. Sullivan (NP)

Judge Position 1
Adams Superior Court 
Richard W. Miller (NP)

Judge Position 1
Chelan Superior Court 
Lesley A. Allan (NP)

Judge Position 2
Chelan Superior Court 
Ted W. Small (NP)

Judge Position 3
Chelan Superior Court 
John E. Bridges (NP)

Judge Position 1
Clallam Superior Court 
Kenneth D. Williams (NP)

Judge Position 2
Clallam Superior Court 
George L. Wood (NP)

Judge Position 3
Clallam Superior Court 
Brooke Taylor (NP)

Judge Position 1
Clark Superior Court 
Roger A. Bennett (NP)

Judge Position 2
Clark Superior Court 
John P. Wulle (NP)

Judge Position 3
Clark Superior Court 
John F. Nichols (NP)

Judge Position 4
Clark Superior Court 
Edwin L. Poyfair (NP)

Judge Position 5
Clark Superior Court 
Robert L. Harris (NP)

Judge Position 6
Clark Superior Court 
Barbara D. Johnson (NP)

Judge Position 7
Clark Superior Court 
James E. Rulli (NP)

Judge Position 8
Clark Superior Court 
Diane Woolard (NP)

Judge Position 9
Clark Superior Court 
Robert Lewis (NP)

Judge Position 10
Clark Superior Court: new position (NP)

Judge Position 1
Cowlitz Superior Court 
James Edgar F. Xavier Warme (NP)

Judge Position 2
Cowlitz Superior Court 
Stephen M. Warning (NP)

Judge Position 3
Cowlitz Superior Court 
Jill M. Johanson (NP)

Judge Position 4
Cowlitz Superior Court 
Jim Stonier (NP)

Judge Position 1
Douglas Superior Court 
John Hotchkiss (NP)

Judge Position 1
Grant Superior Court 
Evan E. Sperline (NP)

Judge Position 2
Grant Superior Court 
Kenneth L. Jorgensen (NP)

Judge Position 3
Grant Superior Court 
John Antosz (NP)

Judge Position 1
Grays Harbor Superior 
Court Gordon Godfrey (NP)

Judge Position 2
Grays Harbor Superior 
Court Dave Edwards (NP)

Judge Position 3
Grays Harbor Superior 
Court F. Mark McCauley (NP)

Judge Position 1
Island Superior Court 
Alan R. Hancock (NP)

Judge Position 2
Island Superior Court 
Vickie Churchill (NP)

Judge Position 1
Jefferson Superior 
Court Craddock D Verser (NP)

Judge Position 1
King Superior Court 
Charles W. Mertel (NP)

Judge Position 2
King Superior Court 
Cheryl Carey (NP)

Judge Position 3
King Superior Court 
Julie A. Spector (NP)

Judge Position 4
King Superior Court 
Mary E. Roberts (NP)

Judge Position 5
King Superior Court 
Steven C. Gonzalez (NP)

Judge Position 6
King Superior Court 
Philip G. Hubbard Jr (NP)

Judge Position 7
King Superior Court 
Kim Prochnau (NP)

Judge Position 8
King Superior Court 
Jay V. White (NP)

Judge Position 9
King Superior Court 
Jeffrey M. Ramsdell (NP)

Judge Position 10
King Superior Court 
Glenna Hall (NP)

Judge Position 11
King Superior Court 
Catherine Shaffer (NP)

Judge Position 12
King Superior Court 
Dean S. Lum (NP)

Judge Position 13
King Superior Court 
Terence Lukens (NP)

Judge Position 14
King Superior Court 
Brian D. Gain (NP)

Judge Position 15
King Superior Court 
Mary Yu (NP)

Judge Position 16
King Superior Court 
Michael Hayden (NP)

Judge Position 17
King Superior Court 
Donald D. Haley (NP)

Judge Position 18
King Superior Court 
Susan J. Craighead (NP)

Judge Position 19
King Superior Court 
Harry J. McCarthy (NP)

Judge Position 20
King Superior Court 
Michael J. Heavy (NP)

Judge Position 21
King Superior Court 
Greg Canova (NP)

Judge Position 22
King Superior Court 
Douglas McBroom (NP)

Judge Position 23
King Superior Court 
Andrea Darvas (NP)

Judge Position 24
King Superior Court 
Michael J. Fox (NP)

Judge Position 25
King Superior Court 
James A. Doerty (NP)

Judge Position 26
King Superior Court 
Laura Middaugh (NP)

Judge Position 27
King Superior Court 
Joan DuBuque (NP)

Judge Position 28
King Superior Court 
Carol A. Schapira (NP)

Judge Position 29
King Superior Court 
Sharon S. Armstrong (NP)

Judge Position 30
King Superior Court 
Douglass North (NP)

Judge Position 31
King Superior Court 
Helen Halpert (NP)

Judge Position 32
King Superior Court 
LeRoy McCullough (NP)

Judge Position 33
King Superior Court 
Richard D. Eadie (NP)

Judge Position 34
King Superior Court 
Michael Trickey (NP)

Judge Position 35
King Superior Court 
Paris K. Kallas (NP)

Judge Position 36
King Superior Court 
George T. Mattson (NP)

Judge Position 37
King Superior Court 
Nicole MacInnes (NP)

Judge Position 38
King Superior Court 
Richard McDermott, Jr. (NP)

Judge Position 39
King Superior Court 
Patricia Clark (NP)

Judge Position 40
King Superior Court 
Bruce W. Hilyer (NP)

Judge Position 41
King Superior Court 
Palmer Robinson (NP)

Judge Position 42
King Superior Court 
Chris Washington (NP)

Judge Position 43
King Superior Court 
William L. Downing (NP)

Judge Position 44
King Superior Court 
Ronald Kessler (NP)

Judge Position 45
King Superior Court 
Jim Rogers (NP)

Judge Position 46
King Superior Court 
Suzanne M. Barnett (NP)

Judge Position 47
King Superior Court 
Deborah Fleck (NP)

Judge Position 48
King Superior Court 
Laura Inveen (NP)

Judge Position 49
King Superior Court 
Monica J. Benton (NP)

Judge Position 50
King Superior Court 
James D. Cayce (NP)

Judge Position 51
King Superior Court 
John Erlick (NP)

Judge Position 52
King Superior Court 
Bruce E. Heller (NP)

Judge Position 1
Kitsap Superior Court 
Leonard W. Costello (NP)

Judge Position 2
Kitsap Superior Court 
Leila Mills (NP)

Judge Position 3
Kitsap Superior Court 
Anna Laurie (NP)

Judge Position 4
Kitsap Superior Court 
Theodore Spearman (NP)

Judge Position 5
Kitsap Superior Court 
Jay B. Roof (NP)

Judge Position 6
Kitsap Superior Court 
Russell W. Hartman (NP)

Judge Position 7
Kitsap Superior Court 
M. Karlynn Haberly (NP)

Judge Position 8
Kitsap Superior Court 
Sally Olsen (NP)

Judge Position 1
Kittitas Superior Court 
Michael E. Cooper (NP)

Judge Position 2
Kittitas Superior Court 
Scott Sparks (NP)

Judge Position 1
Lewis Superior Court 
Nelson E. Hunt (NP)

Judge Position 2
Lewis Superior Court 
Jim Lawler (NP)

Judge Position 3
Lewis Superior Court 
Richard L. Brosey (NP)

Judge Position 1
Lincoln Superior Court 
Philip W. Borst (NP)

Judge Position 1
Mason Superior Court 
James B. Sawyer II (NP)

Judge Position 2
Mason Superior Court 
Toni A. Sheldon (NP)

Judge Position 1
Okanogan Superior Court 
Jack Burchard (NP)

Judge Position 1
Pierce Superior Court 
Jim Orlando (NP)

Judge Position 2
Pierce Superior Court 
Katherine Stolz (NP)

Judge Position 3
Pierce Superior Court 
Thomas P. Larkin (NP)

Judge Position 4
Pierce Superior Court 
Bryan E. Chushcoff (NP)

Judge Position 5
Pierce Superior Court 
Vicki L. Hogan (NP)

Judge Position 6
Pierce Superior Court 
Rosanne Buckner (NP)

Judge Position 7
Pierce Superior Court 
Frederick W. Fleming (NP)

Judge Position 8
Pierce Superior Court 
Brian Tollefson (NP)

Judge Position 9
Pierce Superior Court 
Sergio Armijo (NP)

Judge Position 10
Pierce Superior Court 
D. Gary Steiner (NP)

Judge Position 11
Pierce Superior Court 
John A. McCarthy (NP)

Judge Position 12
Pierce Superior Court 
Stephanie A. Arend (NP)

Judge Position 13
Pierce Superior Court 
Kathryn Nelson (NP)

Judge Position 14
Pierce Superior Court 
Susan Serko (NP)

Judge Position 15
Pierce Superior Court 
Thomas Felnagle (NP)

Judge Position 16
Pierce Superior Court 
Lisa Worswick (NP)

Judge Position 17
Pierce Superior Court 
Ronald Culpepper (NP)

Judge Position 18
Pierce Superior Court 
Beverly G. Grant (NP)

Judge Position 19
Pierce Superior Court 
Linda Lee (NP)

Judge Position 20
Pierce Superior Court 
Kitty-Ann van Doorninck (NP)

Judge Position 21
Pierce Superior Court 
Frank E. Cuthbertson (NP)

Judge Position 22
Pierce Superior Court 
John Hickman (NP)

Judge Position 1
Skagit Superior Court 
John M. Meyer (NP)

Judge Position 2
Skagit Superior Court 
Michael E. Rickert (NP)

Judge Position 3
Skagit Superior Court 
Susan K. Cook (NP)

Judge Position 4
Skagit Superior Court 
David Needy (NP)

Judge Position 1
San Juan Superior Court 
John O. Linde (NP)

Judge Position 1
Snohomish Superior Court 
Ronald L. Castleberry (NP)

Judge Position 2
Snohomish Superior Court 
James H. Allendoerfer (NP)

Judge Position 3
Snohomish Superior Court 
Thomas J. Wynne (NP)

Judge Position 4
Snohomish Superior Court 
Linda C. Krese (NP)

Judge Position 5
Snohomish Superior Court 
Gerald L. Knight (NP)

Judge Position 6
Snohomish Superior Court 
Richard J. Thorpe (NP)

Judge Position 7
Snohomish Superior Court 
George N. Bowden (NP)

Judge Position 8
Snohomish Superior Court 
Eric Lucas (NP)

Judge Position 10
Snohomish Superior Court 
Kenneth L. Cowsert (NP)

Judge Position 11
Snohomish Superior Court 
Larry E. McKeeman (NP)

Judge Position 12
Snohomish Superior Court 
Anita L. Farris (NP)

Judge Position 13
Snohomish Superior Court 
Michael Downes (NP)

Judge Position 14
Snohomish Superior Court 
Ellen Fair (NP)

Judge Position 15
Snohomish Superior Court 
Bruce Weiss (NP)

Judge Position 1
Spokane Superior Court 
Robert D. Austin (NP)

Judge Position 2
Spokane Superior Court 
Neal Q. Rielly (NP)

Judge Position 3
Spokane Superior Court 
Tari S. Eitzen (NP)

Judge Position 4
Spokane Superior Court 
Kathleen M. O'Connor (NP)

Judge Position 5
Spokane Superior Court 
Michael P. Price (NP)

Judge Position 6
Spokane Superior Court 
Salvatore (Sam) Cozza (NP)

Judge Position 7
Spokane Superior Court 
Maryann C. Moreno (NP)

Judge Position 8
Spokane Superior Court 
Harold D. Clarke (NP)

Judge Position 9
Spokane Superior Court 
Jerome J. Leveque (NP)

Judge Position 10
Spokane Superior Court 
Linda G. Tompkins (NP)

Judge Position 11
Spokane Superior Court 
Greg D. Sypolt (NP)

Judge Position 12
Spokane Superior Court 
Ellen Kalama Clark (NP)

Judge Position 1
Thurston Superior Court 
H. Christopher Wickham (NP)

Judge Position 2
Thurston Superior Court 
Paula Casey (NP)

Judge Position 3
Thurston Superior Court 
Richard A. Strophy (NP)

Judge Position 4
Thurston Superior Court 
Wm. Thomas McPhee (NP)

Judge Position 5
Thurston Superior Court 
Richard D. Hicks (NP)

Judge Position 6
Thurston Superior Court 
Christine A. Pomeroy (NP)

Judge Position 7
Thurston Superior Court 
Gary Tabor (NP)

Judge Position 8
Thurston Superior Court 
Anne Hirsch (NP)

Judge Position 1
Walla Walla Superior Court 
Robert L. Zagelow (NP)

Judge Position 2
Walla Walla Superior Court 
Donald Schacht (NP)

Judge Position 1
Whatcom Superior Court 
Ira Uhrig (NP)

Judge Position 2
Whatcom Superior Court 
Steven J. Mura (NP)

Judge Position 3
Whatcom Superior Court 
Charles R. Snyder (NP)

Judge Position 1
Whitman Superior Court 
David Frazier (NP)

Judge Position 1
Yakima Superior Court 
Susan L. Hahn (NP)

Judge Position 2
Yakima Superior Court 
Michael G. McCarthy (NP)

Judge Position 3
Yakima Superior Court 
F. James Gavin (NP)

Judge Position 4
Yakima Superior Court 
Blaine Gibson (NP)

Judge Position 5
Yakima Superior Court 
Robert N. Hackett Jr. (NP)

Judge Position 6
Yakima Superior Court 
Ruth Reukauf (NP)

Judge Position 7
Yakima Superior Court 
Michael E. Schwab (NP)

Judge Position 8
Yakima Superior Court 
James C. Lust (NP)

References

2008 Washington (state) elections
Washington (state) judicial elections